Macumba, also spelled Makumba , is a term that has been used to describe various religions of the African diaspora found in Brazil, Argentina, Uruguay, and Paraguay. It is sometimes considered by non-practitioners to be a form of witchcraft or black magic.

The Atlantic slave trade of the 16th to 19th centuries brought millions of West and Central Africans to Brazil. There, traditional West and Central African religions continued to be practiced, often syncretising with each other and with both indigenous American and European influences. Among the Afro-Brazilian religious traditions that emerged were Candomblé, Umbanda, and Quimbanda. During the 19th century, the term Makumba was used generically in reference to all of these religions.

By the late 20th century, the term Makumba was often reserved for those religious traditions whose focus was on dealing with "low" spirits, who were sometimes termed exus or devils. These practices differed from Candomblé and Umbanda, which focused on interactions with the orixá spirits.

Etymology 

Macumba (from Kimbundu: ma'kôba) is a percussion instrument of African origin, similar to the reco-reco.

Within the context of East/East-Central Africa, for instance, Philpot (1936) presents a timeline for tribal leadership and succession while simultaneously connecting this to the religious beliefs and practices associated with Makumba. Furthermore, Spier (2020:11-12) notes among the Aushi that "consultants were adamant in their disavowal of his claims, as they insisted that Makumba was never a deity and certainly never had a physical presence as the one that Philpot (1936) presents. Instead, they argue that Makumba is a spirit that is associated with earthquakes."

Definitions

The anthropologist Jim Wafer noted that the term Macumba was often used for "those Brazilian religions that specialize in dealings with 'low' spirits, who may be called 'devils' or exus." He noted that it was often explicitly associated with the "low spiritism" practiced around Rio de Janeiro. The term Macumba is sometimes also used as a colloquial term for all Afro-Brazilian religions. In this, Stafania Capone noted, macumba was used in much the same way as the term calundu, which had been used in the 18th century to describe Afro-Brazilian traditions. Writing in the 1990s, the anthropologist Robert A. Voeks noted that those who took an extremely negative view of Candomblé still viewed it as being "impregnated with devil worship and macumba."

History
Brazilian Macumba designates all Bantu religious practices, mainly in the Brazilian state of Bahia in the nineteenth century. Later (in the 20th century), these practices were organized into what is now called Umbanda, Quimbanda, and Omoloko. Macumba became common in parts of Brazil, Uruguay, Paraguay, and Argentina. The word macumba is used in Brazil, Paraguay, Argentina, and Uruguay to refer to any ritual or religion of Afro-American origin, and although its use by outsiders is usually derogatory (referring to all kinds of religion, superstitions, and rituals related to luck) and it is considered offensive, among its practitioners it is not seen negatively.

See also
 Candomblé
 Quimbanda
 Umbanda

References

Citations

Sources

Further reading
 Kelly E. Hayes, "Black Magic and the Academy: Macumba and Afro-Brazilian “Orthodoxies," History of Religions, 46,4 (2007), 283–315.
“Macumba - Definition and Synonyms of Macumba in the English Dictionary.” English Dictionary, englishdictionary.education/en/macumba.
Philpot, Roy (1936). "Makumba-The Baushi Tribal God". The Journal of the Royal Anthropological Institute of Great Britain and Ireland, 66: 189-208.
Shapiro, Dolores J. “Blood, Oil, Honey, and Water: Symbolism in Spirit Possession Sects in Northeastern Brazil.” Wiley, November 1995.
Spier, Troy E. (2020). A Descriptive Grammar of Ikyaushi. Tulane University, New Orleans, LA: Ph.D. dissertation.

External links

Afro-American religion
Afro-Brazilian culture
Religious syncretism in Brazil
Sacrifice